is a Japanese football player who plays for Matsumoto Yamaga FC. He formerly played for the Japanese national team.

Club career
Tanaka was born in Matsumoto on 31 July 1982. He played for Yokohama Flügels youth team. However Flügels was merged with cross-town Yokohama Marinos (later Yokohama F. Marinos) and Flügels was dissolved end of 1998 season. So, he moved to Yokohama F. Marinos youth team.

Tanaka was promoted to Yokohama F. Marinos top team in 2000. He debuted in 2000 Emperor's Cup. He played many matches as defensive midfielder in 2001 season and Marinos won the champions in 2001 J.League Cup. However he could hardly play in the match in 2002.

In June 2002, Tanaka moved to Tokyo Verdy on loan. He was converted to right side back and became a regular player. However his opportunity to play decreased behind Masayuki Yanagisawa in 2003.

In 2004, Tanaka returned to Yokohama F. Marinos. He became a regular player as right side midfielder from summer and Marinos won the champions J1 League. From 2005, he played more than 30 games every season until 2008.

In 2009, Tanaka moved to Nagoya Grampus. He became a regular player as right side-back soon under manager Dragan Stojković. In 2010, Grampus won the champions in J1 League first time in the club history. In 2011, Grampus also won the 2nd place in J1 League.

In 2014, Tanaka moved to his local club Matsumoto Yamaga FC in J2 League. He was given number "3" shirt, which Tanaka's teammate at Marinos, Naoki Matsuda wore. Tanaka played as regular player and won the 2nd place and was promoted to J1 first time in the club history. In 2015 season, although he played all 34 matches, the club finished at the 16th place of 18 clubs and was relegated to J2 in a year. In 2018, the club won the champions in J2 and was promoted to J1 again.

National team career
On August 9, 2006, Tanaka debuted for Japan national team against Trinidad and Tobago.

Club statistics

National team statistics

Honors and awards

Club
 Yokohama F. Marinos
 J1 League: 2004

 Nagoya Grampus
 J1 League: 2010
 Japanese Super Cup: 2011

References

External links
 
Japan National Football Team Database

Profile at Matsumoto Yamaga FC 

1982 births
Living people
Association football people from Nagano Prefecture
Japanese footballers
Japan international footballers
J1 League players
J2 League players
J3 League players
Yokohama F. Marinos players
Tokyo Verdy players
Nagoya Grampus players
Matsumoto Yamaga FC players
Asian Games medalists in football
Footballers at the 2002 Asian Games
Association football defenders
Asian Games silver medalists for Japan
Medalists at the 2002 Asian Games